Dundee is an unincorporated community in Barton County, Kansas, United States.

History
Dundee had a post office from 1881 until 1902. The post office was re-established in 1915, and finally closed again in 1943.

Dundee was a station and shipping point on the Atchison, Topeka and Santa Fe Railway.

References

Further reading

External links
 Barton County maps: Current, Historic, KDOT

Unincorporated communities in Barton County, Kansas
Unincorporated communities in Kansas